Bogislaw V (c. 1318 – 23 April 1374),  sometimes known as the Great, was a Duke of Pomerania.

Eldest son of Duke Wartislaw IV and Elisabeth of Lindow-Ruppin, Bogislaw had two brothers, Barnim IV and Wartislaw V. The brothers were joint rulers from their father's death in 1326. They allied with King Casimir III of Poland, whose daughter Elisabeth married Bogislaw, against the Teutonic Order. Elisabeth died in 1361; in 1362 Bogislaw married Adelheid Welf, daughter of Ernest I, Duke of Brunswick-Grubenhagen.

The death of Barnim in 1366 led to a quarrel between Bogislaw and Wartislaw, which was settled by a treaty in 1368 partitioning Pomerania between Bogislaw V, Wartislaw V, and Barnim's sons, Bogislaw VI and Wartislaw VI. Bogislaw received most of the Farther Pomeranian parts of Pomerania-Wolgast, thence Pomerania-Stolp (named after the town of Stolp, now Słupsk). Wartislaw received the Neustettin (now Szczecinek) area, and the sons of Barnim received North-Western Pomerania with Rügen and Usedom.

Bogislaw's daughter Elisabeth married the Holy Roman Emperor Charles IV, King of Bohemia in 1363 and he concluded an alliance with his son-in-law in 1370.

Marriages and children

On 28 February 1343, Bogislaw married his first wife Elisabeth of Poland. She was a daughter of Casimir III of Poland and his first wife Aldona of Lithuania. They had two children:

Elizabeth of Pomerania (1347 – 15 April 1393). She married Charles IV, Holy Roman Emperor. 
Casimir IV of Pomerania (c. 1351 – 2 January 1377).

Elisabeth died in 1361. In 1362, Bogislaw V married his second wife Adelheid of Brunswick-Grubenhagen. She was a daughter of Ernest I, Duke of Brunswick-Grubenhagen and Adelheid of Everstein. They had four children:

Wartislaw VII of Pomerania (d. 24 February 1395). Father of Eric of Pomerania.
Bogislaw VIII of Pomerania (c. 1363 – 11 February 1418). 
Barnim V of Pomerania (1369 – 16 May 1402). 
Margaret of Pomerania (1366 – 1407/1410). Married Ernest, Duke of Austria.

Ancestors

See also
List of Pomeranian duchies and dukes
Pomerania during the Late Middle Ages
Duchy of Pomerania
Partitions of the Duchy of Pomerania
Pomerania-Stolp
House of Pomerania

References

Sources

External links
His listing in "Medieval lands" by Charles Cawley. The  project "involves extracting and analysing detailed information from primary sources, including contemporary chronicles, cartularies, necrologies and testaments."

14th-century German nobility
Dukes of Pomerania
1318 births
1374 deaths